Chompa Toung (Golden champak), also known in English as Crocodile Man 2, is a 1969 fantasy Cambodian horror film. It is the sequel to the 1967 film Crocodile Man. It is loosely based on one of the Royal Poems written by Khmer King Ang Duong (1796–1860).

Plot
Chompa Tong, a daughter of a king received two pets which one was a kitten and another was a crocodile's egg but she dropped the egg into the water where it grew into a powerful crocodile who could turn into a man and killed many women for food and fun. One day, Chompa Tong, was kidnapped and a young prince called Jak Jan, swam into the water to save her. Can Jak Jan save the princess from the terrible crocodile?

Cast
Dy Saveth
Kong Som Eun
Seng Bothum

Soundtrack

 Prasna Boun Kar

1969 films
Khmer-language films
1969 horror films
Natural horror films
Cambodian horror films
Films about crocodilians